Green Island Stadium() was a multi-purpose stadium in Shenyang, China.  It is currently the biggest indoor stadium in Asia, used mostly for football matches.  The stadium holds 30,000 fixed seats plus 6,000 movable seats. It opened in 2009 and was demolished in June 2012.

References 

Football venues in China
Multi-purpose stadiums in China
Sports venues in Liaoning
Sports venues demolished in 2012
Demolished buildings and structures in China